The Odessaer Zeitung was a German newspaper from Odessa, founded in 1861.
It was published 3 times a week, later daily,  except on Sundays and holidays.  Some of its volumes can be found at the library of the German Institut für Auslandsbeziehungen.

References

Publications established in 1861
Publications disestablished in 1918
Daily newspapers published in Ukraine
Bessarabia
1861 establishments in the Russian Empire
Defunct newspapers published in Ukraine